Bangirana Kawooya Anifa (born 21 January 1957), is a Ugandan politician who served as a Women Representative from 2000-2020 Member of Parliament and is now representing Mawogola West Constituency Ssembabule district in the Ugandan Parliament (2021 up-to-date).
She concurrently serves as a member on the Equal opportunities and Foreign affairs committees.

Background and education
She was born in Ssembabule district in Uganda, on 21 January 1957.

She earned her bachelor's degree of Arts and Development Studies that was awarded by Nkumba university in 2004. Later in 2001, she was awarded a Masters’ degree of international relations by the same university in 2007.

Career and politics
Before she became a member of the parliament of Uganda in 2001, Anifa  worked as a Constituent Assembly Delegate(1993–1995), she served as the Executive Publicity secretary for the National Women Council (1998–2002) as well served as a deputy resident district commissioner in Rakai district and as a speaker for Ssembabule District local government, as a caucus treasurer for the National Resistance Movement.

In 2016 she became a member a member of the Panafrican parliament up-to-date

She subscribes to the ruling National Resistance Movement political party.

References

Members of the Parliament of Uganda
Women members of the Parliament of Uganda
Living people
National Resistance Movement politicians
1957 births
21st-century Ugandan politicians
21st-century Ugandan women politicians